Dagmawit Moges Bekele  (born 10 December 1983) is an Ethiopian politician who had served as the Minister of Transport and Communications of Ethiopia from October 2018 to 14 January 2023. She has served also as Deputy Mayor and Communication Affairs Bureau Head of Addis Ababa City Administration. Dagmawit was previously Deputy Mayor of Addis Ababa.

On 14 January 2023, the Council of Minister approved that Dagmawit would left the position, alongside the Ministry of Mines and Petroleum Takele Uma Banti.

Education and career
Dagmawit was studied BA in Public Administration and Development Management (PADM) before working in Addis Ababa University with Graduate Assistant Lecturer. Dagmawit earned MA in Public Management and Policy (MPMP) from the same department and university. Afterward, Dagmawit worked as a general manager of Kolfe Keranio sub-city of Addis Ababa, and served as Micro and small Enterprises Development Bureau Head before serving as a Deputy Bureau head of Addis Ababa City Government Trade and Industry Bureau. She then served as a Deputy Bureau of Addis Ababa City Government Building Bureau.

Dagmawit served as a Deputy Mayor and Communication's Affaires bureau, cabinet member and board chairperson of Addis Ababa Mass Media Agency. During Prime Minister Abiy Ahmed premiership, she was appointed as board chairperson of Ministry of Transportation and Communications from October 2018. The position earned her to several leadership, such as a board member of the Ethiopian Airlines, Ethiopian Petroleum Enterprise and investment board member of Public Partnership (PPP).

On 14 January 2023, Dagmawit left the Ministry position by the approval of the Council of Ministers of Abiy Ahmed, along with the Ministry of Mines and Petroleum Takele Uma Banti.

References

External links
Dagmawit Moges: Ethiopian Woman in Politics (interview in Amharic)

21st-century Ethiopian politicians
1983 births
Living people
Government ministers of Ethiopia
21st-century Ethiopian women politicians